The 2019 Grand Rapids mayoral election took place on November 5, 2019 to elect the mayor of Grand Rapids, Michigan.

Incumbent Rosalynn Bliss faced a challenge from Daniel Allen Schutte, a local pastor and candidate for the 75th District of Michigan House of Representatives. Bliss defeated Schutte in a landslide, thus securing 2nd term as the mayor.

Results

References

Mayoral elections in Grand Rapids, Michigan
2019 Michigan elections
Grand Rapids
Grand Rapids